Mike Terpstra (born 24 April 1987) is a Dutch professional racing cyclist. He is the brother of fellow racing cyclist Niki Terpstra.

Major results
2013
 7th Volta Limburg Classic
 9th Overall Kreiz Breizh Elites

References

External links
 
 
 
 

1987 births
Living people
Dutch male cyclists
Sportspeople from Beverwijk
Cyclists from North Holland
21st-century Dutch people